Route 870 is a  long north-east to south-west secondary highway in the south-western portion of New Brunswick, Canada.

Route description
Most of the route is in Kings County.

The route's northeastern terminus is in Kierstead Mountain near Pleasant Ridge at Route 10 where it travels southeast through a mostly wooded area to Collina. From here, the route continues through Upper Belleisle and Belleisle Creek to the western terminus of Route 875. The route then passes through Elm Brook to its terminus in the community of Springfield at Route 124.

History

See also

References

870
870